is a Japanese fantasy original video animation (OVA) series of fairy tales and other classic stories produced by Studio Unicorn in 1986.

Outline 
The series originally consists of 10 12-minutes episodes, played in each videotape both in Japanese and English languages with the purpose of teaching English to Japanese children. The English track was provided by studio Academy.

It was then released by Saban Productions for foreign market. Saban's adaptation consisted in a totally different English dub, a new score and the inclusion of 4 short films from Toei Animation's unrelated series World Famous Fairy Tale Series, for a total of 14 episodes.

Ownership of the series passed to Disney in 2001 when Disney acquired Fox Kids Worldwide, which also includes Saban Entertainment. Despite that the series is not available on Disney+.

Episodes
Original Japanese ten-episode release:
In the U.S. there were five VHS volumes, totalling fourteen episodes:

Cast

Japanese Cast 

 Toshiko Fujita - Narrator

 Arisa Andou
 Chika Sakamoto
 Daisuke Gouri
 Eriko Hara
 Kenichi Ogata
 Kōzō Shioya
 Yoshino Ohtori

English cast

Academy dub 

 Susan Brooks - Narrator

 Charmian Norman Taylor
 James House
 Michael Bannard
 Steve Long

Saban dub 

 Barbara Goodson - Narrator (in "Puss in Boots"), Fairy Godmother (in "Cinderella"), Farmer's Wife, Little Boy, Mother Duck (in "The Ugly Duckling"), Mermaid Queen (in "The Little Mermaid")
 Doug Lee - Narrator (in "Red Riding Hood")
 Robert Axelrod - Narrator (in "The Ugly Duckling")
 Steve Kramer - Narrator (in "The Wolf and the Seven Little Kids")
 Ted Lehman - Narrator (in "Snow White" and "The Three Little Pigs")
 Bill Capizzi - Puss in Boots (in "Puss-in-Boots"), Rooster (in "The Ugly Duckling")
 Cam Clarke - Bo (in "The Wolf and the Seven Little Kids"), The Ugly Duckling (in "The Ugly Duckling"), Michael's Brother (in "Puss-in-Boots"), Prince John (in "Cinderella")
 Frank Catalano - Michael (in "Puss-in-Boots")
 Rebecca Forstadt - Little Red Riding Hood (in "Red Riding Hood"), The Little Mermaid (in "The Little Mermaid"), Little Girl (in "The Ugly Duckling"), Young Cinderella (in "Cinderella")
 Wendee Lee - Cinderella (in "Cinderella"), Snow White (in "Snow White")
 Clifton Wells - Old Duck (in "The Ugly Duckling")
 Dave Mallow - Guard, Michael's Brother, Peasant (in "Puss-in-Boots")
 Edie Mirman - Cassim's Wife (in "Ali Baba and the Forty Thieves")
 Edward Mannix - Huntsman (in "Snow White")
 Lara Cody - Princess (in "Puss-in-Boots")
 Michael Reynolds - Dwarf, Magic Mirror (in "Snow White"), King (in "Puss-in -Boots"), Mermaid King (in "The Little Mermaid")
 Michael Sorich - Dwarf (in "Snow White)
 Richard Epcar - Ogre (in "Puss-in-Boots")
 Robert Barron - Farmer, Villager (in "Red Riding Hood"), Father (in "Cinderella"), Father, Frog, Peasant (in "Puss-in-Boots"), Paka (in "Ali Baba and the Forty Thieves")

 Alice Smith
 Benjamin Walker
 Kimberly Crystal
 Kris Noel Pearson
 Stanley Harold
 Xavier Garcia

Music
The original incidental music was composed by Masahito Maruyama, and by Haim Saban and Shuki Levy for the Saban version. Most of Saban and Levy's music was reused in the later TV series Grimm's Fairy Tale Classics.

Releases
In 1987, the series was originally released on five VHS volumes by Hi-Tops Video. A sixth and final VHS volume was released by Hi-Tops Video in 1990, featuring a rerelease of The Little Mermaid and including the King Grizzlebeard episode from Grimm's Fairy Tale Classics as a bonus episode. The Daily Mirror (a British newspaper) released The Three Little Pigs and Alibaba and Forty Thieves on a promotional DVD in 2006. US distributor Digiview Entertainment released The Wizard of Oz episode as part of their Cartoon Craze series.

References

External links
 
 My Favorite Fairy Tales Volume 1 at IMDb
 My Favorite Fairy Tales Volume 2 at IMDb
 My Favorite Fairy Tales Volume 3 at IMDb
 My Favorite Fairy Tales Volume 4 at IMDb

1986 films
1986 fantasy films
1986 anime television series debuts
Japanese children's animated fantasy television series
Television series by Saban Entertainment
1986 anime OVAs